Athletics competitions at the 2005 Bolivarian Games were held at the Parque del Atletismo en el Estadio Centenario de Armenia in Armenia, Colombia, between August 18–21, 2005.  

Gold medal winners from Ecuador were published by the Comité Olímpico Ecuatoriano.

A total of 47 events were contested, 24 by men and 23 by women, resulting in 25 new Games records.

Medal summary

Medal winners were published.

All results are marked as "affected by altitude" (A), because Armenia is located at 1,551 m above sea level.

Men

Notes
†: Yojer Medina from Venezuela came in third in the
discus throw event achieving 50.76 m, but he was not entitled to a bronze medal; only two medals per country.

Women

Notes
*: Yomara Hinestroza from Colombia came in third in the 100 metres competition in 11.56 s, but she was not entitled to get a bronze medal (only two medals per country).

**: Darlenis Obregón from Colombia came in third in the 200 metres competition in 23.10 s, but she was not entitled to get a bronze medal (only two medals per country).

***: Johanna Triviño from Colombia came in third in the long jump competition achieving 6.04 m (0.7 m/s), but she was not entitled to get a bronze medal (only two medals per country).

Medal table (unofficial)

Participation
According to an unofficial count, at least 200 athletes from 5 countries participated.

 (10)
 (66)
 (45)
 (13)
 (66)

References

Athletics at the Bolivarian Games
International athletics competitions hosted by Colombia
Bolivarian Games
2005 in Colombian sport